is a Japanese actor, voice actor and singer whose major roles include Eiji Kikumaru in The Prince of Tennis, Tobias in Pokémon anime series, Kenji Harima in School Rumble, Hisoka in Hunter × Hunter (1999), Katsuya Jonouchi in Yu-Gi-Oh! Duel Monsters and Takato Saijō in Dakaichi. In video games, he provides the voice of Ryu in the newer Street Fighter games. He is married to voice actress Aiko Aihashi. Their first son was born on June 24, 2016.

Filmography

Anime

Audio recordings

Tokusatsu

Video games

Dubbing

Live-action

Other roles

Discography

Albums

Singles
source:
 (心を信じて)	()
 (今日もまた太陽は容赦なく輝く)
 "Be Yourself" 
 (まだ見ぬ先へ)
 (ダイヤモンドの勇気)
 "Blessings"

References

External links
 Official agency profile 
 

1974 births
Living people
Japanese male musical theatre actors
Japanese male stage actors
Japanese male video game actors
Japanese male voice actors
Male voice actors from Tokyo
Singers from Tokyo
20th-century Japanese male actors
21st-century Japanese male singers
21st-century Japanese male actors
21st-century Japanese singers